Buergeriellidae is a family of worms belonging to the order Polystilifera.

Genera:
 Buergeriella Brinkmann, 1917

References

Polystilifera
Nemertea families